Aspergillus mangaliensis is a species of fungus in the genus Aspergillus. It is from the Flavipedes section. The species was first described in 2015.

References 

mangaliensis
Fungi described in 2015